Erin Barrett (born 1968) is an author, trivia writer, and life coach.

Biography
Erin Barrett was born in 1968. She grew up in South East Asia. She attended Samford University and has a BA in Humanities from the New College of California. Currently she lives in Fremont, California.

She and her ex-husband Jack Mingo are co-founders and co-writers of the Ask Jeeves series of trivia books which published selected "questions as they flowed, unedited, into the well-known Web site". They were relied upon by game shows such as Who Wants to be a Millionaire? and have generated over 30,000 trivia questions for online games. Barrett has a decade of work within the wine industry.

On February 27, 2004, Barrett appeared as one of the Three Wise Men, a lifeline introduced in the U.S., on Who Wants to Be a Millionaire.

Selected works
 Just Curious, Jeeves: What Are the 1001 Most Intriguing Questions Asked on the Internet? (2000)  
 Just Curious About History, Jeeves (2002)  
 Just Curious About Animals and Nature, Jeeves (2002) 
 Doctors Killed George Washington: Hundreds of Fascinating Facts from the World of Medicine (2002) 
 Not Another Apple for the Teacher: Hundreds of Fascinating Facts from the World of Education (2002) 
 Random Kinds Of Factness: 1001(or So) Absolutely True Tidbits About (Mostly) Everything (2005) 
 Just Curious about Science, Jeeves (2003) 
 It Takes a Certain Type to be a Writer: Facts from the World of Writing and Publishing (2003) 
 W. C. Privy's Original Bathroom Companion (2003) 
 Cause of Death: A Perfect Little Guide to What Kills Us (2009)

References

1969 births
Living people
People from Alameda, California
American women writers
21st-century American women